Basima is a town and tehsil in Washuk District of Balochistan, Pakistan. It lies on the N-85 and N-30 National Highway. The cruise missiles fired off from Arabian sea during the 1998 US strike on Afghanistan, were seen flying over this town by local people and one of the unexploded cruise missiles was found  from the town.

See also
 Washuk
 Mashkel
 Kalgali

References

Populated places in Balochistan, Pakistan
Washuk District
Tehsils of Balochistan, Pakistan